Coust is a commune in the Cher department in the Centre-Val de Loire region of France.

Geography
The commune shares a border with the département of Allier.

Population

Sights
 The twelfth-century church of Notre-Dame.
 The ruins of the fourteenth-century castle of Le Creuzet.
 The remains of feudal fortifications at Meslon, and a dovecote.
 The chateau of Bonnais, dating from the thirteenth century.
 Three old washhouses.

See also
Communes of the Cher department

References

External links

Coust on the Quid website 

Communes of Cher (department)